The 2020 Women's World Chess Championship was a chess match for the Women's World Chess Championship title. It was contested by Ju Wenjun (world champion as winner of the 2018 knock-out championship) and her challenger, Aleksandra Goryachkina, the winner of a newly established Candidates Tournament that was held in 2019. 

The match was planned in two parts, one held in Shanghai (China) and one in Vladivostok (Russia), from 3 to 24 January 2020. It marked the return to a match only format for the title with qualifying Candidates Tournament, after new FIDE president Arkady Dvorkovich had expressed his dissatisfaction with the knock-out tournaments and resulting frequently changing world champions.

Ju Wenjun successfully defended her title.

Candidates Tournament
The newly established candidates tournament was held from 29 May till 19 June 2019 in Kazan, Russia. The format was an eight player double round-robin tournament.

Three  players qualified by virtue of reaching the semi-finals of the last championship. All remaining players came from the rating list, by taking the average of all twelve monthly ratings in 2018. Aleksandra Goryachkina replaced Hou Yifan, who declined an invitation.

Qualifiers

Goryachkina won with two rounds to spare.

Crosstable
Leading player after each round in green.
{| class="wikitable" style="font-size:85%;"
|-
!rowspan="2"|No.!!rowspan="2"|Player!!rowspan="2"|Elo(May 2019) 
!colspan="2" rowspan="2"|1
!colspan="2" rowspan="2"|2
!colspan="2" rowspan="2"|3
!colspan="2" rowspan="2"|4
!colspan="2" rowspan="2"|5
!colspan="2" rowspan="2"|6
!colspan="2" rowspan="2"|7
!colspan="2" rowspan="2"|8
!rowspan="2"|Pts!! colspan=2|Tie-breaks!!colspan="14"|Results by round!!rowspan="2"|Place
|-
! H2H !! Wins
!1
!2
!3
!4
!5
!6
!7
!8
!9
!10
!11
!12
!13
!14
|-  style="text-align:center; background:white; color:black;"
|1||align="left"|
|2506
| style="background:lightgrey;" colspan="2"|
|1|||0
|0|||0
|½|||½
|0|||1
|½|||1
|0|||0
|1|||0
|5½|| || 
|½||½||1½||1½||2||2||3||3½||3½||3½||4½||5½||5½||5½
|8
|-  style="text-align:center; background:white; color:black;"
|2||align="left"|
|2546
|0|||1
| style="background:lightgrey;" colspan="2"|
|½|||0
|½|||½
|1|||0
|0|||1
|½|||½
|½|||0
|6|| || 
|½||1||1||1½||2½||2½||3||3||3½||4½||4½||4½||5½||6
|7
|-  style="text-align:center; background:white; color:black;"
|3||align="left"|
||2522
|1|||1 
|½|||1 
| style="background:lightgrey;" colspan="2"|
|1|||½
|1|||½
|½|||0
|½|||½
|1|||½
|9½|| || 
|½||bgcolor=#cfc|1½||bgcolor=#cfc|2½||3||bgcolor=#cfc|4||bgcolor=#cfc|5||bgcolor=#cfc|5½||bgcolor=#cfc|6½||bgcolor=#cfc|7½||bgcolor=#cfc|8||bgcolor=#cfc|8½||bgcolor=#cfc|9||bgcolor=#cfc|9½||bgcolor=#cfc|9½
|1
|-  style="text-align:center; background:white; color:black;"
|4||align="left"|
|2554
|½|||½ 
|½|||½
|0|||½
| style="background:lightgrey;" colspan="2"|
|½|||½
|1|||½
|½|||0
|1|||½
|7||1½|| 
|½||1||1||2||2½||3½||4||4½||5||5½||6||6||6½||7
|3
|-  style="text-align:center; background:white; color:black;"
|5||align="left"|
|2510
|1|||0
|0|||1
|0|||½
|½|||½
| style="background:lightgrey;" colspan="2"|
|1|||½
|1|||0 
|½|||0 
|6½||1½|| 
|½||bgcolor=#cfc|1½||bgcolor=#cfc|2½||bgcolor=#cfc|3½||3½||3½||4||4||4||4½||4½||5½||6||6½
|5
|-  style="text-align:center; background:white; color:black;"
|6||align="left"|
|2563
|½|||0
|1|||0
|½|||1
|0|||½
|0|||½
| style="background:lightgrey;" colspan="2"|
|½|||½ 
|½|||1
|6½||½|| 
|½||1||1||1||1½||2½||3||3½||4½||5||5½||5½||5½||6½
|6
|-  style="text-align:center; background:white; color:black;"
|7||align="left"|
|2539
|1|||1
|½|||½
|½|||½ 
|½|||1
|0|||1 
|½|||½ 
| style="background:lightgrey;" colspan="2"|
|0|||½ 
|8|| || 
|½||½||½||1||1½||2½||3||3½||4½||5||5½||6½||7½||8
|2
|-  style="text-align:center; background:white; color:black;"
|8||align="left"|
|2513
|0|||1
|½|||1
|0|||½
|0|||½
|½|||1
|½|||0
|1|||½
| style="background:lightgrey;" colspan="2"|
|7||½|| 
|½||1||2||2½||2½||2½||2½||3½||3½||4||5||5½||6||7
|4
|}

Championship match
As in 2018, the match was divided into two parts, hosted by the countries of the players. One stage was held in Shanghai, China and the other in Vladivostok, Russia. In Shanghai the match was played in the InterContinental Shanghai Jing'An Hotel, in Vladivostok at the Far Eastern Federal University on Russky Island. The format was increased to twelve games, the last championships consisted of only 10 scheduled games.

The classical time-control portion of the match ended with a tied score of 6-6, after 3 victories of Ju, 3 victories of Goryachkina, and 6 draws. On 24 January, 4 games of rapid chess were used as a tie-breaker; and Ju Wenjun retained the title with 1 win and 3 draws.

Schedule
Match started off in Shanghai and ended in Vladivostok.

Results

References

External links
Official website
Championship at Fide website
FIDE Women's Candidates on World Chess 

Women's World Chess Championships
2020 in chess
Chess
Chess in China
Chess in Russia
Sports competitions in Shanghai
Sport in Vladivostok
January 2020 sports events in China
January 2020 sports events in Russia